The Jimmy Timmy Power Hour is a trilogy of crossover television specials between the American animated series The Adventures of Jimmy Neutron, Boy Genius and The Fairly OddParents, consisting of The Jimmy Timmy Power Hour, The Jimmy Timmy Power Hour 2: When Nerds Collide, and The Jimmy Timmy Power Hour 3: The Jerkinators. The specials premiered on Nickelodeon between 2004 and 2006, and were subsequently released to home video. They combine multiple types of animation, using traditional animation for the segments set in the Fairly OddParents universe and computer animation for the Jimmy Neutron segments. The events of the crossover specials take place during the second and third seasons of The Adventures of Jimmy Neutron, Boy Genius and during the fourth and fifth seasons of The Fairly Oddparents.

Specials

The Jimmy Timmy Power Hour (2004)
Struggling with his science project, Timmy Turner wishes that he could be sent to the best laboratory in any universe. When his fairy godparents, Cosmo and Wanda, fulfill this wish, Timmy is sent to the town of Retroville in the universe of child prodigy Jimmy Neutron. Jimmy is sent to Dimmsdale in Timmy's universe when he activates a magical transporter created by Cosmo and Wanda. As they attempt to return to their respective worlds, Timmy and Jimmy meet the various side characters of each universe and Timmy becomes romantically involved with Jimmy's classmate, Cindy Vortex. While messing around in Jimmy's lab, Timmy accidentally turns Goddard, Jimmy's robotic dog, into a giant, violent monster. He manages to stop Goddard from destroying Retroville, but he is then contacted by Jimmy, who tells him that Mr. Crocker, Timmy's fairy-obsessed teacher, has stolen the transporter, allowing him to take over Fairy World. The two work together to stop Crocker and manage to return to their own universes. Back in Dimmsdale, Timmy realizes that he never finished his project, but at the last second, Jimmy teleports Goddard to the science fair, allowing Timmy to win.

The Jimmy Timmy Power Hour 2: When Nerds Collide (2006)
Timmy and Jimmy enter each other's worlds for a second time, both wanting to ask Cindy out to their school dance celebrating Friday the 13th. In an attempt to gain Cindy's affections, the two engage in a battle of smarts that sends Jimmy and his friends to Dimmsdale. As Jimmy seeks to prove that Timmy is a fraudulent scientist, Cosmo and Wanda struggle to keep their existence a secret from the people of Retroville. Meanwhile, Professor Calamitous, a major villain in Jimmy's universe, unleashes a surge of anti-fairies from Fairy World that threatens the rotation of Timmy's Earth. Jorgen von Strangle, the powerful fairy commander and enforcer of Da Rules, gets increasingly frustrated by both Jimmy and Timmy's friends and their manipulation of fairy magic. In addition, Jorgen is forced to work with Calamitous after he is betrayed by the leader of the anti-fairies, Anti-Cosmo.

The Jimmy Timmy Power Hour 3: The Jerkinators (2006)
In their third and final encounter, Timmy and Jimmy make amends while trying to defeat the enemies from their own universes—including a monster that they concoct together—while accidentally rejecting their respective friends in the process, including Cindy. Initially, they are unable to make the monster evil enough to fight them properly, but when they succeed, he almost immediately turns against them and absorbs Cosmo and Wanda's magic and Jimmy's intelligence, and then begins destroying both children's universes.

Cast

Debi Derryberry as Jimmy Neutron
Tara Strong as Timmy Turner and School Girl
Rob Paulsen as Carl Wheezer, Eustace Strych, Bucky McBadbat, Butler, Announcer, and Anti-Fairy Walla
Carolyn Lawrence as Cindy Vortex and Mrs. Folfax
Jeffrey Garcia as Sheen Estevez and Anti-Fairy Walla
Crystal Scales as Libby Folfax
Daran Norris as Cosmo, Anti-Cosmo, Mr. Turner, and Jorgen Von Strangle
Susanne Blakeslee as Wanda, Anti-Wanda, Mrs. Turner, and Anti Fairy #1
Jason Marsden as Chester McBadbat
Grey DeLisle as Vicky and Principal Waxelplax
Mark DeCarlo as Hugh Neutron
Megan Cavanagh as Judy Neutron
Gary LeRoi Gray as A.J.
Carlos Alazraqui as Mr. Crocker and Mayor of Dimmsdale
Dee Bradley Baker as Sanjay, Elmer, Binky Abdul, and Fairy Guard #1
Jim Ward as Tour Guide, Chet Ubetcha, and Anti Fairy #2
Faith Abrahams as Francis
Kevin Michael Richardson as Morgan Freeman and Anti-Fairy Walla
Tim Curry as Professor Calamitous
Jeff Garlin as Villain ("Shirley")
Jeff Bennett as Fairy Guard #2 (uncredited) and Dr. Moist
Frank Welker as Goddard and Special Vocal effects
Billy West as Sam Melvick, Corky Shimatzu, Blix, and British Official
Jay Leno as Nega-Chin
Dan Castellaneta as Goddard's Decimator voice (Uncredited)
Chris Kirkpatrick as Chip Skylark (Archive Footage)
Nic Nagel as Additional Voices and Anti-Fairy Walla (Uncredited)

Production
Each special in the Jimmy Timmy Power Hour series combines the 2D hand-drawn traditional animation of the Fairly OddParents and the 3D computer-generated imagery animation of The Adventures of Jimmy Neutron, Boy Genius. This blending of animation techniques was a technical challenge for the studios responsible for both series, according to Keith Alcorn, co-founder of series producer DNA Productions.

Release and reception
According to Variety, the first special was seen by nearly five million viewers on its Nickelodeon premiere, on May 7, 2004. Terry Kelleher of People gave the first special three stars out of four, calling it a "blast of creativity" although hard to follow. The Washington Post similarly gave it praise. The network considered it a success. The second special, aired January 16, 2006, was seen by nearly 5.5 million viewers, according to The New York Times. The third and final special aired July 21, 2006.

See also
 List of Nickelodeon original films

External links

References

2004 television films
2004 films
2006 television films
2006 films
Film series introduced in 2004
2000s animated television specials
2000s American television specials
American animated television films
Jimmy Neutron films
The Fairly OddParents films
American computer-animated films
Animated crossover films
Films set in California
Films set in London
Films set in Pisa
Films set in Texas
2000s American animated films
Films about parallel universes
Films scored by Guy Moon
DNA Productions films
Frederator Studios
American children's animated comedy films
American children's animated fantasy films
Animated films about children
Television crossover episodes
2000s English-language films